San Isidro is a district of the León Cortés Castro canton, in the San José province of Costa Rica.

Geography 
San Isidro has an area of  km² and an elevation of  metres.

Locations 
 Poblados (villages): Alto Carrizal, Loma de la Altura, Santa Rosa (part), Trinidad

Demographics 

For the 2011 census, San Isidro had a population of  inhabitants.

Transportation

Road transportation 
The district is covered by the following road routes:
 National Route 313

References 

Districts of San José Province
Populated places in San José Province